Harold McDonald Paul (31 August 1886 – 18 April 1948) was a Scottish amateur football forward who played in the Scottish League for Queen's Park. He was capped by Scotland at international level.

Personal life 
Paul attended Crieff Academy and Glasgow University, studying veterinary surgery at the latter institution. He later became a member of the Royal College of Veterinary Surgeons. During the First World War, Paul served as an enlisted man in the Scottish Horse and then as an officer in the Royal Army Veterinary Corps. He returned to veterinary surgery after the war.

Career statistics

References

Further reading

External links

London Hearts profile (Scotland)
London Hearts profile (Scottish League)

1886 births
Scottish footballers
Scottish Football League players
British Army personnel of World War I
Association football forwards
Queen's Park F.C. players
1948 deaths
Scottish Horse soldiers
Royal Army Veterinary Corps officers
Footballers from Glasgow
Alumni of the University of Glasgow
Scotland international footballers
Scottish Football League representative players
Scottish veterinarians
Place of death missing